The men's road race at the 1982 UCI Road World Championships was the 49th edition of the event. The race took place on Sunday 5 September 1982 and was based around the Goodwood Circuit, England. The race was won by Giuseppe Saronni of Italy.

Final classification

References

Men's Road Race
UCI Road World Championships – Men's road race
1982 Super Prestige Pernod